Siluete (trans. The Silhouettes) were a Serbian and Yugoslav rock band formed in Belgrade in 1961. They were one of the pioneers of the Yugoslav rock scene.

Soon after the formation, Siluete, fronted by charismatic vocalist Zoran Miščević, gained the attention of the audience with their live performances. In 1963 the original members of the band departed, a part of the original lineup continuing with new members as The Shadows-inspired instrumental band, and later performing with vocalist Tomi Sovilj. In 1964 Miščević returned to Siluete, and the band soon gained nationwide fame thanks to their energetic and sometimes transgressive live performances. During the 1960s they were one of the most popular Yugoslav rock bands, Miščević becoming the first superstar of the Yugoslav rock scene. The Yugoslav press compared their rivalry with the band Elipse (whose keyboardist Zoran Simjanović was one of the forming members of Siluete) to the one between The Rolling Stones and The Beatles. In the late 1960s the band performed abroad, trying to secure a contract with a foreign record label and, after failing to do so, disbanded in 1971. Miščević reformed Siluete in the mid-1970s and continued to lead them through the following years. A number of musicians passed through the band, with Mišćević and keyboardist Ljuba Đorđević being the only mainstay members. The band held numerous performances in the late 1970s and the 1980s, but enjoyed little media attention and popularity. Miščević died in 1995, Siluete thus ending their activity.

History

1961–1971
Siluete were officially formed on October 20, 1961, by Zoran Miščević (vocals and bass guitar), Branko Gluščević (formerly of the combo Black Cats, rhythm guitar), Ilija Stanić (guitar), Zoran Simjanović (keyboards) and Jovan "Miške" Mišević (drums). The band members, influenced by the film The Young Ones and the film appearance of Cliff Richard and The Shadows, decided to name the band Siluete, after Gluščević's idea. The band had their first performance on a school dance in Belgrade Economy School, which was followed by performances on numerous dances, in the café at the Tašmajdan Park and in the club Euridika. Mišević was soon replaced by more experienced Miroslav "Mine" Minić. At the beginning of 1962, the band had their first appearance in front of larger crowd, on a concert of popular singer Đorđe Marjanović, held in Belgrade's Trade Union Hall. Siluete appeared on stage to perform as Marjanović's backing band on the songs "My Girl Josephine" and "Peppermint Twist". During 1962 they actively performed on dances and even in the club Orfeum as a part of the club's cabaret program. For a short period of time percussionist Gvozden Eror performed with them. 

After performances in Makarska and Dubrovnik during the summer of 1963, the forming members of Siluete departed. Simjanović moved to Elipse, Miščević, Gluščević and Minić formed Lutalice (The Wanderers) with guitarist Božidar "Lari" Plesničar and rhythm guitarist Slobodan Mihajlović, and Ilić continued to lead Siluete in the new lineup: Dejan Dunjić (bass guitar), Jovan Mišević (drums), Miomir "Kraka" Petrović (formerly of Safiri, rhythm guitar) and Ljuba Đorđević (keyboards). This lineup of the band performed The Shadows-influenced instrumental music. On one of their performances they were approached by singer Tomislav "Tomi" Sovilj (formerly of Zlatni Dečaci), who suggested they work together, so he became the band's new singer. As Lutalice disbanded in 1964, Miščević moved back to Siluete. However, Siluete still had a contract with Sovilj, so for a short period of time they performed with two singers: Sovilj would perform in the first part of concerts and Miščević in the second. After a year spent in Siluete, Sovilj left the band, Siluete continuing with Miščević as the sole vocalist.

The new lineup had their first large performance in the Vuk Karadžić Cultural Centre, on the concert entitled "Koncert za karikaturu i tvist" ("A Concert for Caricature and Twist), organized by the satirical magazine Jež (Hedgehog). The band played numerous concerts in the club Euridika, the café in the Tašmajdan Park, the City Basement dancing hall and Belgrade Youth Center. On October 14, 1964, they appeared, alongside Faraoni, Elipse, Detlići and Crveni Koralji, on the Vatromet ritma (Fireworks of Rhythm) festival in Novi Sad. The bands that performed were chosen via poll conducted by the music magazine Ritam. This concert was a part of Parada ritma (Parade of Rhythm) concert series, arguably the first rock festival in a communist country. In mid-1964, Tomi Sovilj formed his own Siluete, but the members of the original Siluete filed a lawsuit against him, so Sovilj continued to perform with his band under the name Tomi Sovilj i Njegove Siluete (Tomi Sovilj and His Silhouettes). 

During 1965 Siluete shocked the Yugoslav public with their energetic live performances and their appearance, which secured them with huge popularity. At the time there were around 230 rock bands in Belgrade, but most of them had short hair and tidy clothes, which were the standards Siluete changed. In 1965 the band performed on the Parada ritma festival held in Hall 3 of the Belgrade Fair in front of some 3,500 people. Siluete performed in the competitive part of the program alongside Plamenih 5, Sanjalice, Juniori, Plavi Dečaci and Elipse and were proclaimed the Best Band. In 1965 the band appeared in Branko Bauer's film Doći i ostati (To Come and to Stay). At the first edition of the Belgrade Gitarijada festival, held on January 9, 1966, at Belgrade Fair – Hall 1, Siluete performed with other popular rock bands. They were proclaimed the second best band (behind Elipse) by the jury, but were voted the Best Band by the audience. On the festival debuted the band's new guitarist Dragi Jelić, formerly of the band Beduini (The Bedouins). As all the members of the band except Jelić had long hair, he appeared on the stage wearing a wig. During the year the band had more than 80 concerts across Yugoslavia, often performing large venues. In Skopje they performed during pouring rain in front of about 6,000 people. During 1966 they often performed in Belgrade and Zagreb at the exhibitions of painter Olja Ivanjicki. In 1966 they also appeared in Sava Popović's short film Rapsodija u crnom (Rhapsody in Black).

In 1966 Siluete released their first EP, Tvoj rođendan (Your Birthday). Besides the title track, which was a cover of Small Faces song "Sha-La-La-La-Lee", the EP featured the songs "Najdraži san" ("The Dearest Dream", a cover of The Searchers song "When You Walk in the Room"), "Keti" ("Cathy") and "Uhvati vetar" ("Catch the Wind", a cover of Donovan's "Catch the Wind"). All the lyrics were written by Miomir Petrović. The release was disliked by the press, and the band members themselves stated that the songs were recorded hastily and that they are not satisfied with the EP. However, Tvoj rođendan was sold more in than 60,000 copies. In 1967 the band released two more EPs. The first one was entitled Dona. Beside the title track, which was a cover of Ritchie Valens song "Donna", the EP featured the songs "Noć za ljubav" ("A Night for Love", a cover of The Troggs song "With a Girl Like You"), "Moj srećan dom" ("My Happy Home", a cover of Stonewall Jackson song "I Washed My Hands in Muddy Water") and "Uzmi ili ostavi" ("Take It or Leave It", a cover of The Rolling Stones' "Take It or Leave It"). The second EP was entitled Kišu sam tražio (I Asked for Rain). This was the band's first release to feature their own songs, the title track and the song "Raskid" ("Breakup"), both of them written by Dunjić. The other two songs on the EP were "Voleti nekog" ("To Love Somebody", a cover of the Bee Gees' "To Love Somebody") and "Plakaću sutra" ("I'll Cry Tomorrow", a cover of The Searchers' "I'll Cry Tomorrow").

The releases brought them new attention of the media, which started promoting rivalry between Silute and Elipse, comparing it to the one between The Rolling Stones and The Beatles, Elipse usually being proclaimed more competent musicians and Siluete better showmen. In 1967 both bands performed as the opening acts on The Searchers concerts in Belgrade and Zrenjanin. During the year Siluete won the first place on the second edition of Gitarijada festival. They appeared in TV show Koncert za ludi mladi svet (A Concert for Young Crazy World) with the songs "I'm a Man" and "Massachusetts", the videos for which were shot in the Wild West town settings in the Avala Film Studios. In 1967 Srđan Karanović, at the time a film direction student, made a television movie about the band, entitled Učio sam dve godine kontrabas (I Learned to Play Bass for Two Years), and the band also appeared in the TV series Krug dvojkom (A Round by Streetcar No. 2) as cavemen creating music by using bones. In 1967 they were voted the best Yugoslav band by the readers of the youth magazine Mladost (Youth). The band appeared on front covers of various magazines and Miščević's long blond hair caused numerous scandals. There were several attempts by citizens of Belgrade to cut his hair, so he got the media's attention by trying to insure his hair. He provoked the conservative public by posing for photographers under a hooded dryer and stating that the band modeled their image after Mona Lisa, by wearing excessive jewellery and stating that his only mistake was not being born in the age of Romulus and Remus. Prior to a concert in Zagreb Miščević announced that he would kill twenty chickens on stage, and on a concert in Niš he provoked audience to trow rotten fruit on stage. On some of the concerts Miščević organized dancing competitions for girls from the audience, with the first prize being a week of dating him, the second prize three days of dating him and the third prize a date with him. He started receiving hundreds of fan letters, becoming the first Yugoslav superstar since singer Đorđe Marjanović, and young people across Yugoslavia sprayed the band's name on walls. However, a part of the press criticized the band for dedicating most of their attenttion to their appearance and not making any efforts to improve their musical skills and sound. 

Encouraged by the success in Yugoslavia, the band decided to try to break into the foreign market, for months they performing in Austria and West Germany. In Vienna they performed in the clubs Chattanooga and Star Club. The Austrian newspaper Kurier wrote about their performances describing them as "descendants of hajduks who fought against the Turks". However, the guitarist Dragi Jelić left the band and joined Džentlmeni (later forming highly successful YU Grupa with his brother Žika Jelić). Jelić was replaced by a former Džentlmeni member Slobodan Todorović. During one of their absences from Yugoslavia some Yugoslav newspapers published the rumor that Siluete performed at a graveyard in Nuremberg.

After their efforts to gain success abroad failed, the band decided to dedicate themselves to their status on the Yugoslav scene. They organized a comeback concert in Belgrade Youth Center, which featured Džentlmeni as the opening band and a guest appearance by the jazz ballet group Džezabal (Jazzabelle). The press praised the performance and the fact the band started dedicating more attention to their musicianship. After the concert the band went on a Yugoslav tour during which they performed 120 concerts, on which debuted new guitarist Ljubomir Sedlar, formerly of the band Vizije (The Visions). A part of the tour was a twenty-three-hour concert held on New Year's Eve in Belgrade Youth Center. In January 1968, at their concert in Sarajevo, a riot broke out. A large number of chairs was broken, Miščević's shirt was ripped off and his gold necklace was split, Ljuba Đorđević was hit on the head with a bottle and their manager's wallet was stolen. At the Siluete concert in Novi Sad the band members broke their guitars, got in a fight with the audience and the band's van was by damaged by the mob. The band spent the summer of 1968 performing in Belgrade, playing four times a week in the Rade Končar School yard.

In 1969 Dunjić left the band and moved to London. He was replaced by bass guitarist and painter Aleksandar Cvetković. After releasing the single with the songs "Sećanje na Keti" ("Memory of Cathy") and "Dosadan dan" ("Boring Day"), they started performing in clubs all over Europe, once again trying to secure a contract with a foreign record label, but after failing to do so they split-up. The members of the band returned to Yugoslavia, Cvetković joining the band CD, with only Miščević staying in West Germany. He spent two more years there, performing with an Italian band. After returning to Yugoslavia in 1973 he performed with various bands, including the band Formula Ljubavi (Formula of Love) from Inđija, making an appearance on their 1973 7" single "Banane" / "Reka suza" ("Bananas" / "River of Tears"), before he decided to retire from the scene.

1975–1995

In 1975 Miščević decided to reform Siluete. The new lineup featured, beside Miščević, only one former Siluete member, Ljuba Đorđević (keyboards). The rest of the lineup consisted of Slobodan "Boba" Orlić (formerly of Bitnici, bass guitar) Dragan Vukelić (electric piano) and Radomir Dramičanin (formerly of Dah, drums). Siluete went on a tour on which Miščević appeared on stage with a snake, but they saw little success and disbanded once again. In 1976 Miščević and Đorđević reformed Siluete with a group of younger musicians. This lineup recorded the singles "Ponoćni voz" ("Midnight Train") and "Makedonsko devojče" ("Macedonian Girl"), the latter with former Miss Yugoslavia Lidija Vekovska.

During the following years Miščević led Siluete with little success. The new musical trends pushed Siluete to the margin of the Yugoslav scene. The band usually performed smaller venues and saw little media attention. However, they did appear on several large festivals, on which the band would usually perform a cover of Bijelo Dugme's hit "Kad bi bio bijelo dugme" ("If I Were a White Button"), with altered lyrics including the verses "Dok su bile Siluete / Dugmići su bili malo dete" ("While Silhouettes were playing / the Buttons were just kids"). Siluete would appear on Bijelo Dugme's 1979 concert at JNA Stadium as one of the opening bands. More than 180 musicians passed through Siluete, with Miščević and Đorđević being the only mainstay members of the band. Đorđević died in 1986, but Miščević decided to continue the band's activity. In 1994, a various artists compilation album Sjaj izgubljene ljubavi: Muzika šezdesetih (Shine of the Lost Love: Music of the 1960s), a part of the YU retROCKspektiva (YU retROCKspektive) album series, was released, featuring Siluete song "Tvoj rođendan". Zoran Miščević died on April 4, 1995, Siluete thus ending their activity.

Post 1995
In 2000 the compilation album VIS Siluete (VIS being an abbreviation for Vokalno-instrumentalni sastav, trans. Vocal-instrumental ensemble), with an overview of the band's work, was released.

The songs "Tvoj rođendan", "Uhvati vetar" and the previously unreleased instrumental "Tema Silueta" ("Siluete's Theme") was published on the box set Kad je rock bio mlad – Priče sa istočne strane (1956–1970) (When Rock Was Young – East Side Stories (1956–1970)), released by Croatia Records in 2005 and featuring songs by the pioneering Yugoslav rock acts. "Tema Silueta" was recorded in 1962, on a rehearsal in Gvozden Eror's apartment.

Siluete former guitarist Miroslav Petrović formed the old city music band Daniluške. He wrote the main theme for Branko Bauer's TV series The Farm in the Small Marsh, appearing in the series in a supporting role. He died at the beginning of the 1990s.

Siluete former drummer Miroslav Minić moved to Germany, where he would perform with Belgrade Show Orchestra. In 1971 he moved to Norway. He performed until 1986, when he dedicated himself to fashion design.

Legacy
Miščević was awarded several times for his contribution to Yugoslav music. He was awarded with SR Serbia Seventh of July Award and the First of May Award.

The song "Uhvati vetar" was covered by the Yugoslav rock band Jura Stublić & Film on their 1989 album Zemlja sreće (Land of Happiness).

Discography

EPs
Tvoj rođendan (1966)
Dona (1967)
Kiša (1967)

Compilation albums
VIS Siluete (2000)

Singles
"Sećanje na Keti" / "Dosadan dan" (1969)
"Makedonsko devojče" / "The Girls From Macedonia" (1976)
"Ponoćni voz" / "Plačem" (1977)

Other appearances
"Tvoj rođendan" / "Uhvati vetar" / "Tema Silueta" (Kad je rock bio mlad – Priče sa istočne strane (1956–1970), 2005)

References

External links
Siluete at Discogs
Siluete at Last.fm

Serbian rock music groups
Serbian rhythm and blues musical groups
Yugoslav rock music groups
Yugoslav rhythm and blues musical groups
Instrumental rock musical groups
Beat groups
Musical groups from Belgrade
Musical groups established in 1961
Musical groups disestablished in 1995
1961 establishments in Yugoslavia
1995 disestablishments in Yugoslavia